is a Japanese manga artist. He graduated from Nihon University. He made his professional manga debut in Weekly Shōnen Sunday in 1989. He is most famous for the manga Ushio & Tora, for which he won Shogakukan Manga Award for shōnen in 1992 and the Seiun Award in 1997, and the long-running Karakuri Circus.

Influences
Fujita stated that he wanted to become a manga artist after reading Rumiko Takahashi's . He also named Yōsuke Takahashi,  and Daijiro Morohoshi as influences.

Works
 , 1990–1996, 33 volumes, Shogakukan's Weekly Shōnen Sunday
 , 1995 (collection of short stories published in Weekly Shōnen Sunday and Shōnen Sunday Zōkan from 1988 to 1994)
  1997–2006, 43 volumes, Shogakukan's Weekly Shōnen Sunday
 , 2004 (collection of short stories published in Weekly Shōnen Sunday and Weekly Young Sunday from 1996 to 2003)
 , 2006–2007, one volume, Shogakukan's Big Comic Spirits
 , 2007, one volume, Kodansha's Morning
 , 2008–2014, 29 volumes, Shogakukan's Weekly Shōnen Sunday
 , 2014–2015, 2 volumes, Kodansha's Morning
 , 2016–2021, 25 volumes, Shogakukan's Weekly Shōnen Sunday
 , 2022–present, Kodansha's Morning

Other
 , 2004–2006, original concept
 , 2006–2007, original concept

Anime adaptations
 Ushio & Tora, 1992–1993 10-episode OVA
 Ushio & Tora: Comically Deformed Theater, 1993 one-episode parody OVA
 Karakuri Circus, 1998 Weekly Shōnen Sunday commercial 
 Puppet Princess, 2000 one-episode OVA adapting a short story published in Yoru no Uta
 Ushio & Tora, 2015–2016 anime television series
 Karakuri Circus, 2018–2019 anime television series

Master

Assistants 
 Nobuyuki Anzai
 Kazurou Inoue
  (Hanamote Katare, Furo Girl!, Yoake no Ryodan)
 
 Makoto Raiku 
  (Mushibugyō)

References

Further reading

External links
 Kazuhiro Fujita's Backstage section at Web Sunday 
 

1964 births
Living people
Manga artists from Hokkaido
Nihon University alumni
People from Asahikawa